A Soul Enslaved is a 1916 American silent drama film directed by actress-turned-director (and suffragist) Cleo Madison, and written by screenwriters Adele Farrington and Olga Printzlau. Madison also stars. The Universal film is believed to be lost.

Plot 
The film—which explores themes of hypocrisy, double standards, and gender norms—features Madison as an activist fighting for better working conditions at her factory job. Madison's character is having an affair with the factory's owner, and she later moves on and marries a man who is unaware of her past. When he discovers that she was previously a "kept woman," he leaves her, only to return after reflecting that he once seduced and abandoned a young woman who committed suicide.

Cast
 Cleo Madison as Jane
 Tom Chatterton as Richard Newton
 Douglas Gerrard as Paul Kent
 Lule Warrenton as Jane's Mother
 Patricia Palmer as Nellie
 Alfred Allen as Ambrose
 Irma Sorter as Young Jane

Production
The film was Madison's directorial feature debut. Production was delayed by nearly 10 days after Madison was struck in the eye by a fishing hook in a freak accident. The incident nearly cost her her sight in that eye.

References

External links

1916 films
Lost American films
American silent feature films
American black-and-white films
1910s American films